Max van Herk (born 3 December 1998) is a Dutch professional footballer who last played as a goalkeeper for FC Dordrecht in the Dutch Eerste Divisie.

Club career
Van Herk began his career at local club VV Spirit, and spent 15 years there before moving to FC Dordrecht on a free transfer in January 2020. He made his full debut for the club a year later, in a 5-0 loss to Roda JC. He kept his first clean sheet in a 1-0 victory over Telstar.

On July 1, 2022, van Herk left FC Dordrecht after the expiration of his contract.

References

External links
 

1998 births
Living people
Dutch footballers
FC Dordrecht players
Eerste Divisie players
Association football goalkeepers